The Spaladium Arena is a multi-purpose indoor arena located in Split, Croatia. It was opened in December 2008, and hosted the following month's World Men's Handball Championship in 2009. The hall will host the event again in 2025 with Croatia, Denmark, and Norway as national co-hosts.

, Spaladium Arena had been closed for more than a year over the inability of its operators to cover the maintenance costs. It was reopened for a Severina concert in December 2013. As of 2020, the arena was largely out of use.

Concerts & events
 Ministry of Sound: New Year's Party; December 31, 2009 – January 1, 2010
 Zdravko Čolić performed a sold out concert on February 14, 2010
 Jelena Rozga performed a sold out concert during her The Bižuterija Tour; February 11, 2011
 Severina Vučković performed a sold out concert during her Dobrodošao u Klub Tour; December 6, 2013
 Dubioza kolektiv performed a concert on March 1, 2014
 Željko Joksimović performed a concert on March 8, 2014
 Marko Perković Thompson performed a concert on December 23, 2014
 Đorđe Balašević performed a concert on May 22, 2015
 Iron Maiden performed a sold out concert on their Book of Souls tour on July 27, 2016
 Maya Berović performed a concert on her Pravo Vreme tour on March 31, 2019
Severina Kojić performed a sold out concert during the Magic Tour; November 16, 2019

Gallery

See also
 List of indoor arenas in Croatia
 List of indoor arenas in Europe

References

External links

Sports venues completed in 2008
Sports venues in Split, Croatia
Indoor arenas in Croatia
Handball venues in Croatia